John Patrick Murphy (1 February 1918 – 2 October 2002) was an Australian rules footballer who played with Collingwood in the Victorian Football League (VFL). Murphy played 160 games for the Magpies, usually in defence, and won the 1941 Copeland Trophy for Collingwood's best and fairest player. His son John played for Sturt in the SANFL and South Melbourne. He died in October 2002 at the age of 84.

References

External links

Biographical details for Jack Murphy

1918 births
2002 deaths
Australian rules footballers from Victoria (Australia)
Collingwood Football Club players
Copeland Trophy winners